EziBuy is a New Zealand and Australian multi-channel retailer. It sells clothes, homeware and gifts through a multi-channel model in both countries.

Products can be purchased through catalogues, and six retail stores around New Zealand. The retailer has a cell centre and distribution centre in Palmerston North, where it has been based since its inception in 1979.

EziBuy has several brands for plus-sized women, including Sara, Formfit, Deesse, Isobar Active Plus and Quayside Plus Size.

History

Gillespie era

EziBuy was established in 1978 by brothers Peter and Gerard Gillespie, and their friend John Robinson in Palmerston North, New Zealand. The business began as a catalogue retailer selling womenswear and menswear. The  first catalogue was a simple folded, A3 black and white page which was mailed to a list of local organisations in 1978.

In January 2002, EziBuy purchased Myer Direct from Coles Myer.

In January 2006, the company opened a new distribution centre in Palmerston North.

EziBuy won the Keith Norris Direct Marketing Organisation of the Year Award in 2012.

Woolworths era

In August 2013, EziBuy was acquired by Woolworths Limited.

At the time of sale, EziBuy was the largest fashion and homeware multi-channel retailer in Australasia. The business mailed over 23 million catalogues every year and processed more than 1.75 million orders annually.

Alceon era

In June 2017, EziBuy was acquired by Alceon Group, a major shareholder of Australian womenswear retailer Noni B, for an undisclosed sum.

In October 2018, Alceon purchased New Zealand children's clothing retailer Pumpkin Patch for an undisclosed sum, allowing it to relaunch the brand through EziBuy.

Noni B era

Noni B purchased a controlling stake of EziBuy from Alceon Group in a $1 peppercorn sale in 2019. The sale was aimed at increasing the retailer's digital sales and giving it access to the New Zealand market.

In August 2021, EziBuy announced a restructure after posting a $28.9 million loss for the year to June 2021 during the COVID-19 pandemic.

References

External links 

Retail companies of New Zealand
Mail-order retailers
Retail companies established in 1978
Palmerston North